The 2005–06 Perth Glory FC season was the club's 9th season since its establishment in 1996. The club competed in the A-League for the 1st time.

Review
In 2005, it was announced that former Liverpool and England star Steve McMahon would be appointed as coach. The new season saw a complete overhaul of the playing squad, with Simon Colosimo and former Sunderland and Leeds striker Brian Deane as key signings. Other notable signings included future young stars Nick Ward and Billy Celeski.

Early results in friendlies against local opposition were not great, but Perth became the first team to defeat Sydney FC, winning 1–0 in the semi-final of the 2005–06 Pre-season Cup before losing in the final 0–1 to the Central Coast Mariners. Perth's woeful recruiting strategy was soon evident with the early departure of star import Brian Deane after seven games. Another McMahon recruit, Northern Ireland junior international Neil Teggart, quit the club prior to the start of the regular season. Deane was replaced by Damian Mori, a former Perth Glory striker. Originally on a three-game temporary contract, after some impressive performances Mori stayed for the rest of the season and finished with seven goals.

However, the club continued to be dogged by problems which would only be later revealed to the public. Steve McMahon was subject to constant media criticism over his coaching style and was accused of nepotism by signing his son, Steve McMahon Jr, who was of questionable talent. Rumours also surfaced that players were planning to stage a revolt against the coach. On 7 December, the club reported that the parties had "amicably" chosen to go separate ways. On 9 December 2005, the club announced that assistant coach Alan Vest would move into the head coach role for the remainder of the season, with striker Damian Mori taking on a dual role as player-coach after being named as his assistant.

The coach's departure was merely a symptom of deeper troubles. Poor performances saw Perth miss out on qualification for the finals for the first time since 1998. Dwindling support from chairman Nick Tana, as he looked to sell his 75% stake in the club, seemed to underpin a general decline in club fortunes. After the Round 20 match against Sydney FC, Alan Vest hinted that the current player group were incapable of achieving anything better and stated that "cliques" had been formed undermining club harmony. To cap off a bad season, Western QBE announced they were withdrawing as major sponsor after being associated with the club for 8 years.

Players

First team squad

Matches

2005–06 A-League fixtures

Ladder

Awards

Perth Glory Most Glorious Player
2005/06 A-League – Bobby Despotovski

References 

2005-06
2005–06 A-League season by team